The Presidential Symphony Orchestra, with headquarters in Ankara, is the presidential symphony orchestra of the Republic of Turkey. Its history dates back as far as 1826, making it one of the first symphony orchestras in the world.

After The Auspicious Incident and closing of the Janissary in 1826 by Sultan Mahmud II, the Mehter Band was transformed to a western band. On September 17, 1828, Giuseppe Donizetti assumed the role of principal conductor. Until Sultan Vahdeddin the band was called Mizika-i Humayun (Mızıka-ı Humayun, the Imperial Band). In Vahdeddin's reign, it was called Makam-i Hilafet Muzikasi (The Caliphs Band).

After the foundation of the Turkish Republic, the State orchestra moved to the new capital Ankara on April 27, 1924, upon the orders of Mustafa Kemal Atatürk, Founding President of the Republic of Turkey. Upon moving to Ankara, the Musiki Muallim Mektebi (Music Teachers School) was also formed (in 1924) with the efforts of Zeki Üngör. This school later became the basis of the Ankara State Conservatory.

On June 25, 1932, the orchestra was named the "Riyaseti Cumhur Orkestrasi" (Republican Orchestra). With this new formation the band and the orchestra clearly separated.  Hasan Ferit Alnar became the conductor of the orchestra, and remained until 1957. In 1957 a law was passed changing the name of the orchestra to the "Cumhurbaskanligi Senfoni Orkestrasi" ("Presidential Symphony Orchestra").

 the Orchestra had played in Germany, Austria, Bulgaria, Rumania, Yugoslavia, the Soviet Union, Italy, France, Switzerland, Iran, Iraq, Lebanon, Sweden, Norway, Finland, Spain, Poland, Cyprus, Czechoslovakia, South Korea, Japan, USA and England.

Between 1961-2020, the orchestra was hosted by the concert hall building near by Ankara Railway Station and was moved to its new venue at CSO Ada Ankara in 2020.

Principal conductors

Guest conductors

References

External links

 
 beethovenlives.net 

Turkish symphony orchestras
Ministry of Culture and Tourism (Turkey)
Musical groups established in the 1820s
Culture in Ankara